Huemul Island is an island in the Nahuel Huapi Lake, off the shore of San Carlos de Bariloche, a city in the province of Río Negro, Argentina, at . It derives its name from the Mapuche chief Güemul, whose tribe inhabited the area. Considered a historical and ecological tourist attraction, it has recently been conceded to the municipality of Bariloche after licitations with the government of Río Negro.

See also
Huemul Project, an Argentine fusion power research program

References

Lake islands of Argentina
Landforms of Río Negro Province